The Southeastern Pennsylvania Transportation Authority operates or contracts operations of these routes serving points in Bucks, Chester, Delaware, and Montgomery counties, with a few routes operating into the city of Philadelphia. The Suburban Transit Division is broken down into three districts: Victory (Formerly: Red Arrow Division), Frontier, and Contract Operations.

Routes

Victory District
These routes are operated from the Victory District, located at the 69th Street Transportation Center in Upper Darby Township, Delaware County. This also includes Norristown High Speed Line (Route 100 before 2009), 101 Media, and 102 Sharon Hill rail operations. These routes were once operated by the Philadelphia Suburban Transportation Company, better known by its nickname "Red Arrow Lines". Routes in the Chester area of Delaware County as well as Chester Pike operations were once operated by Southern Penn Bus Lines, which the Red Arrow took control of on June 30, 1960. Today, Routes 114, 117, and 118 are leftovers of the old Southern Penn system. The Philadelphia Transportation Company's "PTC" Folsom Division bus routes (former Routes 71, 76, and 77 trolley lines as well as bus Route 82) were taken over by Red Arrow Lines on January 20, 1961. Since that time the Ex-PTC routes have been eliminated or consolidated into the current route system. SEPTA took over Red Arrow Lines on January 29, 1970. This was one of the last privately owned transit operations left in the United States. Even today some longtime residents, transit historians, and the local news media still refer to this operation as SEPTA's Red Arrow Division. In 2011 SEPTA renamed 69th Street Terminal the 69th Street Transportation Center.

Frontier District
These routes are operated from the Frontier garage in Plymouth Township, Montgomery County. This district of SEPTA was created through a combination of former Schuylkill Valley Line services in the Norristown area and Trenton Philadelphia Coach Line services in the Lower Bucks County area. Routes 96 to 99 which helped form the original five SEPTA Frontier District Routes were once part of the old "Schuylkill Valley Lines" that SEPTA acquired on March 1, 1976. The old Schuylkill Valley Lines routes were then restructured into five routes on March 7, 1977 with Route 95 being a new route. Routes 127 to 129 were once part of the old Trenton Philadelphia Coach Lines "TPC" which became a subsidiary of the Philadelphia Transportation Company "PTC" on January 24, 1963. When SEPTA took over PTC, Trenton Philadelphia Coach became a subsidiary of SEPTA. These routes were assigned Routes 150 to 153 in 1980.  These routes continued to operate under SEPTA/TPC until November 14, 1983 when SEPTA Frontier District took over the operations of these routes and rebranded them Routes 127, 128, and 129. All other routes have been added onto the system since then. Trenton-Philadelphia Coach Lines was brought back to life by SEPTA as a contract operation for its Routes 310, 311 and LUCY (Route 316) operations. Trenton-Philadelphia Coach also operated the Cornwells Heights Parking Shuttle (Route 312)

Krapf Transit

Service on these lines are operated by Krapf Transit under contract to SEPTA. These routes are operated from Krapf's own garage, located in West Chester, Pennsylvania. Krapf has operated other bus routes for SEPTA in the past: Routes 202 (West Chester to Wilmington), Route 205 (Paoli Railroad Station to Chesterbrook), Route 207 (The West Whiteland WHIRL), Route 208 (Strafford Train Station to Chesterbrook), Route 306 (Great Valley to Brandywine Towne Center in Delaware) and Route 314 (West Chester to Goshen Corporate Park).

SEPTA has had contract bus operations before in Chester County.  SEPTA and Reeder's Inc. joined forces in 1977 to operate three bus routes out of West Chester.  These routes were the Route 120 (West Chester to Coatesville), Route 121 (West Chester to Paoli), and Route 122 (West Chester to Oxford).  Reeder's also operated their own bus route from West Chester to Concord and Tri-State Malls via US 202 and Delaware Route 92. Transit operations in Chester County has been around for decades operating under different companies over those years. West Chester Transportation Company, People's Transportation Company, Chester Valley Lines and The Short Line of Pennsylvania have operated bus routes in Chester County.

Bus service between West Chester and Coatesville was a replacement for the previous trolley service operated by West Chester Traction. Reeder's got these routes when the Short Line of Pennsylvania ceased operations.  To keep transit service operating in Chester County these routes were funded by SEPTA and operated by Reeder's Inc.  beginning November 7, 1977. SEPTA did replace two of the routes with their own bus service. Route 122 service was replaced by SEPTA's Route 91 on July 6, 1982 after only one year of service; Route 91 was eliminated due to lack of ridership. Route 121 was replaced by SEPTA's Route 92 on October 11, 1982; this service continues to operate today.

Since ridership on the Route 120 was strong it continued to operate under the operations of Reeder's Inc. even after SEPTA pulled the funding source. Reeder's Inc bus service to Concord and Tri-State Malls was discontinued in the late 1970s. Krapf purchased the Reeder's operation in 1992 and designated the remaining (West Chester to Coatesville) bus route as Krapf's Transit "Route A". Krapf's owned the Route A. On August 1, 2021, the Route A was replaced by SEPTA Route 135. Krapf's also operates the Coatesville Link that serves the Coatesville area and the SCCOOT in Southern Chester County for the Transportation Management Association of Chester County (TMACC).

The Route 205 service started March 12, 2007 between Paoli Train Station and Main Line Industrial Park, On September 7, 2010 service was extended to Phoenixville. Service to Main Line Industrial Park eliminated at the same time. Service was then rerouted to Chesterbrook after that. Service on the Route 205 was eliminated September 3, 2019. The Route 205 bus only operated on Weekdays.

Krapf's along with SEPTA and the Independence Visitor Center work together to operate the PHLASH bus service. The PHLASH bus service is geared toward tourists visiting the City of Philadelphia but locals use it too since the one way fare is cheaper than SEPTA bus fare, The PHLASH operates April to May on Fridays and weekends then operates seven days a week from Memorial Day through Labor Day. After Labor Day service goes back to Friday and weekend until Thanksgiving then back to seven days a week until the end of the year. After that PHLASH service is suspended for the winter until April.

See also
 SEPTA City Transit Division surface routes

Notes

External links
 SEPTA official website

Suburban Division bus routes
Bus transportation in Pennsylvania
Bus transportation in New Jersey
SEPTA Suburban